The US Yachts US 25 is an American trailerable sailboat, that was designed by Gary Mull and first built in 1981. The design is out of production.

Derived from the Buccaneer 250, the US 25 was later developed into the Triton 25 and produced by Pearson Yachts.

Production
The boat was built by US Yachts, a division of Bayliner, which is itself a division of the Brunswick Boat Group, which is in turn owned by the Brunswick Corporation.

Design
The US 25 is a small recreational keelboat, built predominantly of fiberglass, with wood trim. It has a masthead sloop rig, an internally-mounted  spade-type rudder and a choice of keels. The boat was produced with a standard fin keel, an optional shoal draft keel or a centerboard.

It displaces  and carries  of ballast.

The boat is normally fitted with a small  outboard motor for docking and maneuvering.

The design has sleeping accommodation for five people, with a double "V"-berth in the bow cabin, a drop-down dinette table that forms a double berth in the main cabin to port and an aft quarter berth on the starboard side. The galley is located on the starboard side amidships. The galley is equipped with a two-burner stove and a sink. The enclosed head is located just aft of the bow cabin on the port side.

Variants
US 25
This model has a PHRF racing average handicap of 216.
US 25 SD
This model has a PHRF racing average handicap of 237.
US 25 CB
This model has a PHRF racing average handicap of 234.

Operational history
In a 2010 review Steve Henkel wrote, "A large foretriangle and a blade-like small mainsail gives the appearance of a fast racer, but in reality the boat does not stand out as a particularly fast boat. Best features: Construction was quite good—better than the chopped strand” powerboats built by Bayliner in the early days. Trim included teak and holly sole and other niceties Worst features: The pinched bow gives too little room for a full V-berth; use it for small kids only."

See also
List of sailing boat types

Related development
US Yachts US 22

Similar sailboats
Beachcomber 25
Bayfield 25
Beneteau First 25.7
Beneteau First 25S
Beneteau First 260 Spirit
Bombardier 7.6
Cal 25
Cal 2-25
C&C 25
Capri 25
Catalina 25
Catalina 250
Com-Pac 25
Dufour 1800
Freedom 25
Hunter 25.5
J/24
Jouët 760
Kelt 7.6
Kirby 25
O'Day 25
MacGregor 25
Merit 25
Mirage 25
Northern 25
Redline 25
Sirius 26
Tanzer 25
Watkins 25

References

Keelboats
1980s sailboat type designs
Sailing yachts
Trailer sailers
Sailboat type designs by Gary Mull
Sailboat types built by US Yachts